Anil Kumar Sahani (born 4 July 1963) is an Indian politician who is serving as the MLA for Kurhani Assembly constituency from the Rashtriya Janata Dal party. He was a Member of the Parliament of India representing Bihar in the Rajya Sabha from 2010–18, starting from a by-election in 2010 and then going on to a full term in 2012.

He was elected in April 2012.

He is currently facing an imminent expulsion from the Rajya Sabha as recommended by the Ethics Committee due to irregularities in filing Leave Travel Allowance.

Personal life 
Anil Kumar Sahani was born in the year 1963 in Shahid Jubba Sahni Nagar, Brahmapura in Muzaffarpur district of Indian state Bihar.

Sahani's father's name is Late Shri Mahendra Sahani who was a M.P. and Ex. M.L.C. his mother's name is Shrimati Susheela Devi. Sahani's spouse name is Shrimati Phoolmati Bharti and he has two sons and three daughters.

Positions 

 Jan. 2010 - Elected as member to Rajya Sabha
Feb. 2010 to May 2014 - Member, Committee on Chemical and Fertilizers
Member, Committee on Energy
July 2010 to May 2014 - Member, Consultative Committee for the Ministry of Commerce and Industry
Dec. 2011 to April 2012 - Member, Parliamentary Forum on Disaster Management
April 2012 - Re-elected to Rajya Sabha
Aug. 2014 - Member, Committee on the Welfare of Scheduled Castes and Scheduled Tribes
Sept. 2014 - Member, Committee on Energy
Dec. 2014 - Member, Committee on Member of Parliament Local Area Development Scheme (MPLADS)

References

Janata Dal (United) politicians
1963 births
Living people
Rajya Sabha members from Bihar
People from Muzaffarpur district